The  Treasurer of New South Wales, known from 1856 to 1959 as the Colonial Treasurer of New South Wales, is the minister in the Government of New South Wales responsible for government expenditure and revenue raising and is the head of the New South Wales Treasury. The Treasurer plays a key role in the economic policy of the government.

The current Treasurer, since 5 October 2021 is Matt Kean. The Treasurer is assisted in his portfolio by the following ministers: 
 the Deputy Premier of New South Wales and the Minister for Regional New South Wales, currently Paul Toole, appointed with effect from 6 October 2021;
 the Minister for Finance and Minister for Employee Relations, currently Damien Tudehope, appointed to the Finance portfolio with effect from 2 April 2019, and to the Employee Relations portfolio with effect from 21 December 2021;
 the Minister for Small Business, currently Eleni Petinos, appointed with effect from 21 December 2021.

Each year, the Treasurer presents the NSW Budget to the Parliament. In some other countries the equivalent role is the Minister for Finance, although NSW has had a separate office of that name responsible for regulating government spending. For 103 years the Treasurer was originally known as the 'Colonial Treasurer', however the 'Colonial' word was removed with the passing of the Ministers of the Crown Act 1959 (NSW) from 1 April 1959.

Treasurers Forster, Stuart, Dibbs, Jennings, Reid, Lyne, Waddell, Carruthers, McGowen, Holman, Fuller, Lang, Bavin, Stevens, Mair, McKell, McGirr, Cahill, Heffron, Renshaw, Askin, Lewis, Willis, Wran, Greiner, Fahey and Iemma were also Premier during some or all of their period as Treasurer. By convention, the Treasurer is usually a member of the Legislative Assembly. The exception to this were Treasurers Egan, Costa and Roozendaal, who were members of the Legislative Council during their tenure as Treasurer. Egan is the longest serving Treasurer of New South Wales.

The Treasurer administers his or her portfolio responsibilities through The Treasury cluster, and in particular The Treasury and a range of other government agencies.

List of treasurers

Former ministerial titles

Assistant Treasurers
The Assistant Treasurer, when in use and along with the Minister for Finance, effectively acted as Deputy to the Treasurer. In January 1914, Henry Hoyle was appointed as an Honorary Minister in Holman ministry, charged with the duties of Colonial Treasurer, which was held by Premier Holman, but Hoyle was often referred to as the "Assistant Treasurer".

From 1925–1929 there existed the office of "Assistant Colonial Treasurer". However this office was abolished and when it returned in 1933, it was titled as "Assistant Treasurer". The Assistant Treasurer is not an essential cabinet post, often being appointed on an on-off basis, and there is no Assistant Treasurer at the present. Significantly, the role exists only when in use; there can be a lengthy period between successive holders of the title. The last Assistant Treasurer was John Della Bosca from 1999 to 2006. The title Minister for Finance is also used within New South Wales governments but that role is primarily made responsible for the Revenue collection and administration side of Governance.

See also 

List of New South Wales government agencies
 Deputy Premier of New South Wales
 Minister for Employee Relations
 Minister for Finance
 Minister for Small Business

References

 
New
Treasurer